Elaeocarpus gigantifolius is a species of flowering plant in the Elaeocarpaceae family. It is found only in the Philippines.

References

gigantifolius
Flora of the Philippines
Vulnerable plants
Taxonomy articles created by Polbot